The Goderich–Exeter Railway  is a short line freight railway that operates around  of track in Southwestern Ontario, Canada.  Created in 1992, it was the first short line railway in Canada to be purchased from a class I railway, in this case Canadian National Railway (CN).  It took over operation of further CN trackage in 1998.  As of 2004, the railway had 44 employees.  Its headquarters are in Stratford, Ontario, and owned by short-line railroad holding company Genesee & Wyoming.

History
The Goderich–Exeter Railway was created in 1992 by its owner, RailTex (subsequently purchased by RailAmerica in 2000, and Genesee & Wyoming in late 2012), to operate over Canadian National Railway's Goderich Subdivision,  of track between Stratford and Goderich, Ontario; and its Exeter Subdivision,  of track between Centralia, Ontario and Clinton Jct. that was acquired from CN. The railway started operation on April 3, 1992.

The railway had expressed an interest in acquiring the former CN branchline from Stratford to Owen Sound, but was unable to do so as a result of changes to Ontario labour law which made the acquisition uneconomic.

On February 1, 2021, train 581 ran away down the hill in Goderich, Ontario. They hit a pickup truck, semi truck and a shed. Some cars and the locomotives derailed as a result.

Freight services

The railway handles around 25,000 carloads of freight annually, consisting mainly of automobile parts, salt and fertilizer, wheat, grains, soy meal and rice. From Stratford the line serves the east west corridor of Huron and Perth Counties serving Mitchell, Dublin, Seaforth, Clinton, and Goderich.  There is also a spur line running south from Clinton, serving, Brucefield, Hensall, Exeter, and Centralia.

Traffic on the Goderich Subdivision mainly consists of agricultural products and salt from the Sifto Canada salt mines in Goderich, and construction equipment produced by a Volvo Motor Graders plant in Goderich (closed 2010). It also connects with the port facility at the Port of Goderich. 

As of 29 August 2020, GEXR operates on the Guelph Junction Railway.

Interchanges
The Goderich–Exeter Railway interchanges with CN in Stratford yard.

Locomotives

As of 2017, the railway owned 13 locomotives, which were acquired used.  Its first four locomotives, purchased between 1992 and 1994, were given names of Shakespearean characters (#177 was named "Titania", #178 "Paulina", #179 "Portia", and #180 "Falstaff"), as Stratford is the home of the Canadian Shakespearean Festival.  Unit #'s 178, 179, and 180 have since been sold to other railways.  GEXR was acquired by Genesee & Wyoming in 2012. The railway also leases a few locomotives.  All of its locomotives were made by General Motors Electro-Motive Division and include EMD GP38s, EMD GP35s, EMD GP40s, and EMD SD40-2s. As of March 2017, some of its locomotives are owned by subsidiaries of Genesee & Wyoming.

Roster 
List of GEXR's active units (as of July 2019)

EMD GP40 4095, built in May-1966 Nee SOR 4095 Nee Canadian National 4004

EMD GP38-3 2073, rebuilt April 2017 Nee GEXR 3821

EMD GP38-2 2117, built in Dec-1972 Nee RLHH 2117

EMD GP35 2500, built in March 1965 Nee QRGY 2500

Return of CN
After a 21-year lease to GEXR, CN took over GEXR's yards and the Guelph Subdivision on Nov. 15, 2018. Metrolinx assumed ownership and responsibility for the Guelph Sub from Georgetown to Kitchener. However, GEXR still runs on the Goderich and Exeter Sub.

See also 

 Ion rapid transit

References

External links

Goderich-Exeter railway on Genesee & Wyoming

Ontario railways
Rail transport in the Regional Municipality of Waterloo
Rail transport in Stratford, Ontario
Rail transport in Huron County, Ontario
RailAmerica
Genesee & Wyoming
1992 establishments in Ontario
Standard gauge railways in Canada